Bowdich is a surname. Notable people with the surname include:

David Bowdich (born 1969), American law enforcement officer
Sarah Bowdich Lee (née Wallis) (1791–1866), English author, illustrator, traveller, and zoologist
Thomas Edward Bowdich (1791–1824), English traveller and author